This is a season-by-season list of records compiled by Merrimack in men's ice hockey.

Merrimack has made several appearances in the NCAA Tournament and won the inaugural Division II national championship.

Season-by-season results

Note: GP = Games played, W = Wins, L = Losses, T = Ties

* Winning percentage is used when conference schedules are unbalanced.† Denver's participation in the 1973 tournament was later vacated.

Footnotes

References

 
Merrimack
Merrimack Warriors ice hockey seasons